Gap junction beta-6 protein (GJB6), also known as connexin 30 (Cx30) — is a protein that in humans is encoded by the GJB6 gene.  Connexin 30 (Cx30) is one of several gap junction proteins expressed in the inner ear.  Mutations in gap junction genes have been found to lead to both syndromic and nonsyndromic deafness. Mutations in this gene are associated with Clouston syndrome (i.e., hydrotic ectodermal dysplasia).

Function 

The connexin gene family codes for the protein subunits of gap junction channels that mediate direct diffusion of ions and metabolites between the cytoplasm of adjacent cells. Connexins span the plasma membrane 4 times, with amino- and carboxy-terminal regions facing the cytoplasm. Connexin genes are expressed in a cell type-specific manner with overlapping specificity. The gap junction channels have unique properties depending on the type of connexins constituting the channel.[supplied by OMIM]

Connexin 30 is prevalent in the two distinct gap junction systems found in the cochlea:  the epithelial cell gap junction network, which couple non-sensory epithelial cells, and the connective tissue gap junction network, which couple connective tissue cells.  Gap junctions serve the important purpose of recycling potassium ions that pass through hair cells during mechanotransduction back to the endolymph.

Connexin 30 has been found to be co-localized with connexin 26.  Cx30 and Cx26 have also been found to form heteromeric and heterotypic channels.  The biochemical properties and channel permeabilities of these more complex channels differ from homotypic Cx30 or Cx26 channels.  Overexpression of Cx30 in Cx30 null mice restored Cx26 expression and normal gap junction channel functioning and calcium signaling, but it is described that Cx26 expression is altered in Cx30 null mice.  The researchers hypothesized that co-regulation of Cx26 and Cx30 is dependent on phospholipase C signaling and the NF-κB pathway.

The cochlea contains two cell types, auditory hair cells for mechanotransduction and supporting cells.  Gap junction channels are only found between cochlear supporting cells.  While gap junctions in the inner ear are critically involved in potassium recycling to the endolymph, connexin expression in the supporting cells surrounding the organ of Corti have been found to support epithelial tissue lesion repair following loss of sensory hair cells.  An experiment with Cx30 null mice found deficits in lesion closure and repair of the organ of Corti following hair cell loss, suggesting that Cx30 has a role in regulating lesion repair response.

Clinical significance

Auditory 
Connexin 26 and connexin 30 are commonly accepted to be the predominant gap junction proteins in the cochlea.  Genetic knockout experiments in mice has shown that knockout of either Cx26 or Cx30 produces deafness.  However, recent research suggests that Cx30 knockout produces deafness due to subsequent downregulation of Cx26, and one mouse study found that a Cx30 mutation that preserves half of Cx26 expression found in normal Cx30 mice resulted in unimpaired hearing.  The lessened severity of Cx30 knockout in comparison to Cx26 knockout is supported by a study examining the time course and patterns of hair cell degeneration in the cochlea.  Cx26 null mice displayed more rapid and widespread cell death than Cx30 null mice.  The percent hair cell loss was less widespread and frequent in the cochleas of Cx30 null mice.

References

Further reading 

 
 
 
 
 
 
 
 
 
 
 
 
 
 
 
 
 

  In 
  In 
  In 
  In

External links 

Connexins